Kristian Bjørn (22 August 1919, in Alvdal – 1 April 1993) was a Norwegian cross-country skier who competed in the 1940s and 1950s.

He finished ninth in the 50 km race at the 1948 Winter Olympics. He won a bronze medal in the 4 × 10 km relay at the 1950 FIS Nordic World Ski Championships.

He represented Alvdal IL. He is the father of Torgeir Bjørn.

Cross-country skiing results

Olympic Games

World Championships
 1 medal – (1 bronze)

References

1919 births
1993 deaths
People from Alvdal
Norwegian male cross-country skiers
Cross-country skiers at the 1948 Winter Olympics
Olympic cross-country skiers of Norway
FIS Nordic World Ski Championships medalists in cross-country skiing
Sportspeople from Innlandet